Java is a village on São Tomé Island in the nation of São Tomé and Príncipe. Its population is 19 (2012 census).  It was established as a plantation (roça).

Population history

References

Populated places in Mé-Zóchi District